Drew Lustman, also known as FaltyDL, is an American, New York-based record producer and electronic musician originally from New Haven, Connecticut.

In November 2008, he signed with electronic music label Planet Mu, who released his first two full-length albums, Love Is A Liability (2009) and You Stand Uncertain (2011). In January 2011, he signed with London-based label Ninja Tune, who released Atlantis (2011) and the single Straight & Arrow (2012), which features a remix by Four Tet. His third album, Hardcourage, was co-released on January 21, 2013 through Ninja Tune and his own record label, Blueberry Records. The label was named after the blueberry hill his grandmother owned.  His fourth album In the Wild (2014) was also released by Ninja Tune. In 2015 he released The Crystal Cowboy under his own name for Planet Mu Records. In Fall 2016 he released his latest full-album Heaven Is for Quitters exclusively through Blueberry Records. His current newest release is If All the People Took Acid - EP, released January 2019.

FaltyDL has remixed tracks for notable acts, including Seun Kuti, Mount Kimbie, The xx, Scuba, Photek, Anthony Shake Shakir, and opened for Radiohead's show at Roseland Ballroom in September 2011.

FaltyDL has been interviewed for notable podcasts including RA Exchange, Eclectic Soul, Darker than Wax, Ninja Tune Podcast & No Effects on topics ranging of his process, upbringing, inspiration, early life and current artists that inspire him.

Discography 
 Albums
 A Nurse To My patience (Blueberry Records, 2022)
 Heaven Is for Quitters (Blueberry Records, 2016)
 The Crystal Cowboy (Planet Mu, 2015)
 In the Wild (Ninja Tune, 2014)
 Hardcourage (Ninja Tune, 2013)
 You Stand Uncertain (Planet Mu, 2011)
 Love Is a Liability (Planet Mu, 2009)

 Singles & EPs
 "The Wrath EP" (Studio Barnhus, 2021)
 "Recluse Let Loose" (Blueberry Records, 2020)
 "Flechazo" (Studio Barnhus, 2019)
 "One For UTTU EP" (Unknown To The Unknown, 2019)
 "If All the People Took Acid EP" (Blueberry Records, 2019)
"Taste of Acid EP" (Hypercolour, 2018)
"Three Rooms EP" (Hypercolour, 2018)
 "Wondering Mind" (Aus Music, 2017)
 "Mean Streets Part Three" (Swamp 81, 2016) 
 "River Girl / Do You Box?" (Blueberry Records, 2015) 
 "Visceral" (Ninja Tune, 2015)
 "Rich Prick Poor Dick" (Ninja Tune, 2015)
 "Danger" (Ninja Tune, 2014)
 "She Sleeps (Part 1)" (Ninja Tune, 2013)
 Straight & Arrow (Ninja Tune, 2012)
 Hardcourage (Ninja Tune, 2012)
 Mean Streets Part Two (Swamp 81, 2012)
 Atlantis (Ninja Tune, 2011)
 Make It Difficult (All City Records, 2011)
 Hip Love (Ramp Recordings, 2011)
 Mean Streets Part One (Swamp 81, 2011)
 Endeavour (Planet Mu, 2010)
 All in the Place (Rush Hour Current Direct, 2010)
 Phreqaflex (Planet Mu, 2010)
 To London (Ramp Recordings, 2009)
 Bravery EP (Planet Mu, 2009)
 Party (Ramp Recordings, 2009)
 Rapidly Harvested Asparagus EP (Napalm Enema Records, 2007)
 Beat Lumber (Unfun Records, 2007)
 Callipygian Female Flattery (fizx-recordings, 2007)

Remixes

 "Closer" by Vondelpark (band) (R&S Records, 2014)
 For a full list of remixes see  https://www.discogs.com/artist/889347-FaltyDL?filter_anv=0&subtype=Remix&type=Credits

Films & Animations 

 Drugs (feat. Rosie Lowe) (2016)
 Wolves (2015)
 Watch a Man Die (2015)
 New Haven (2014)
 Dionysos Short Film (2014)
 Straight & Arrow (2012)
 My Light, My Love (2011)
 Dionysos Visualization (2011)

References

External links 
 

Record producers from Connecticut
Living people
American electronic musicians
Jewish American musicians
Year of birth missing (living people)
Planet Mu artists
21st-century American Jews